The Lakeview Mining Company was a uranium reduction plant  north of Lakeview, Lake County, Oregon. The mill began operating in February 1958 and operating until November 1960. The site covered ;  of ore were processed, leaving behind large amounts of residual radioactive material. These were moved to an engineered disposal cell in 1986-1988.

The plant was built in 1957-1958 for a cost of approximately $3 million, selling the yellow cake to Atomic Energy Commission. The plant employed approximately 50 workers. Two successful mines were open in the area, Lucky Lass and White King, feeding the Lakeview plant.

Seven raffinate ponds across  were used for the uranium extraction process, and a  uranium tailings pile existed. In 1961 Kerr-McGee purchased the site; it changed hands several times and by 1968 was owned by Atlantic Richfield (ARCO), which began radiation remediation. More radiation was found in 1976, leading to an ARCO decontamination in 1977 and then sale in 1978, when a lumber company purchased the mill site and reused the ponds and buildings on the eastern edge as a lumber mill.

The Uranium Mill Tailings Radiation Control Act was passed in 1978, leading to federal control of remediation. Work was completed in June 1988 at a cost of $24.5 million. The majority of the contamination was from the ponds, not the tailings pile.

The National Renewable Energy Laboratory and EPA visited the site in 2012 for a feasibility study on geothermal heating, as it is adjacent to Hunter's Hot Springs. The report found it to be "economically marginal".

The lumber mill is still in operation, having been purchased by Pacific Pine Products in 1995, producing custom doors with imported lumber for their Lakeview Millworks division. The company is still using some of the original buildings.

A solar power farm was planned on the western 170 acres of the former mine by Origis Energy in 2016. It was completed in 2017 and named OR Solar 6.

See also
 Climax Uranium Mill
 Sequoyah Fuels Corporation

References

External links
 OLM DOE site from US Department of Energy
 Lakeview Uranium Sites from Oregon Department of Energy
 Lakeview Disposal Cell at Center for Land Use Interpretation

Uranium mines in the United States
Radioactive waste
Cleaning and the environment
Lake County, Oregon